Kathleen Wendy Herald Peyton  (born 2 August 1929), who writes primarily as K. M. Peyton, is a British author of fiction for children and young adults.

She has written more than fifty novels including the much loved "Flambards" series of stories about the Russell family which spanned the period before and after the First World War, for which she won both the 1969 Carnegie Medal from the Library Association and the 1970 Guardian Children's Fiction Prize, judged by a panel of British children's writers. In 1979 the Flambards trilogy was adapted by Yorkshire Television as a 13-part TV series, Flambards, starring Christine McKenna as the heroine Christina Parsons.

Biography

Kathleen Herald was born in Birmingham, began writing when she was nine, and was first published when she was fifteen. She "never decided to become a writer ... [she] just was one." Growing up in London where she could not have a horse she was obsessed with them: all her early books are about girls who have ponies. After school, she went to Kingston Art School, then Manchester Art School. There she met another student, Mike Peyton, an ex-serviceman who had been a military artist and prisoner of war. He shared her love of walking in the Pennines. They married when she was twenty-one and went travelling around Europe.

When they returned to Britain, Peyton completed a teaching diploma. However, after the birth of her second daughter, she turned to writing full-time: mostly boys' adventure stories that she sold as serials to The Scout, magazine of The Scout Association, and later published in full. She began writing as 'K. M. Peyton' at this time; 'M' represented her husband Mike who helped create the plots.

The Peytons loved sailing, and her first books were on that subject; soon, however, she returned to her 'first love', horses, and began to write what became the Flambards series. When Peyton became involved with horse racing, she used those experiences as further inspiration for writing.

Fidra Books has reissued Fly-By-Night and its sequel, The Team (Ruth Hollis series). Oxford University Press, Usborne Publishing and David Fickling Books also publish her work.

Writers who cite K M Peyton as an influence include Linda Newbery, whose young adult novel The Damage Done (2001, Scholastic) is dedicated "to Kathleen Peyton, who made me want to try".

Flambards was published in Italian, German, Finnish, and Swedish-language editions during the 1970s. WorldCat lists eight other languages of publication for her works in all.

Awards

Peyton won the Guardian Prize for the Flambards trilogy, exceptionally, and won the Carnegie Medal for its second book.
She was also a commended runner-up for the Carnegie Medal six times in eight years during the 1960s. One of the books was the first Flambards book, another was the third Flambards book in competition with the Medal-winning second. The others were Windfall (1962), The Maplin Bird (1964), The Plan for Birdmarsh (1965), and Thunder in the Sky (1966).

Peyton was appointed Member of the Order of the British Empire (MBE) in the 2014 New Year Honours for services to children's literature.

Adaptations

The Flambards trilogy was adapted by Yorkshire Television in 1978 as a TV series comprising 13 episodes broadcast 1979 in the UK, 1980 in the US: Flambards, starring Christine McKenna as the heroine Christina Parsons.

The Right-Hand Man (1977), a historical novel featuring an English stagecoach driver, was adapted as a feature film shot in Australia during 1985 and released there in 1987.

Who, Sir? Me, Sir? (1985) was adapted as a BBC TV series.

Works

The bibliography of Peyton's "pony books only" by Jane Badger Books includes all nineteen series books and many "other books" (‡) listed here.

Flambards
 Flambards (Oxford, 1967), illustrated by Victor Ambrus
 The Edge of the Cloud (Oxford, 1969), ill. Ambrus
 Flambards in Summer (Oxford, 1969), ill. Ambrus
 Flambards Divided (1981)
Peyton's extension of the trilogy followed its television adaptation and reversed the original ending.

Ruth Hollis
 Fly-by-Night (1968), self-illustrated
 The Team (1975), self-ill.

Pennington
The Pennington series continues the story of Ruth Hollis.
 Pennington's Seventeenth Summer (1970), later as Pennington's Last Term, self-ill.
 The Beethoven Medal (1971), a.k.a. If I Ever Marry, self-ill.
 Pennington's Heir (1973), self-ill.
 Marion's Angels (1979), later as Falling Angels, ill. Robert Mickelwright

Jonathan Meredith
 Prove Yourself a Hero (1977)
 A Midsummer Night's Death (1978)
 The Last Ditch (1984), also published as Free Rein

See also the Ruth Hollis series: Jonathan Meredith is a minor character in The Team.

Swallow
 The Swallow Tale (1995)
 Swallow Summer (1996)
 Swallow the Star (1997)

Minna
Set in Roman Britain.
 Minna's Quest (2007)
 No Turning Back (2008)
 Far From Home (2009)

Other books

 Grey Star, the Story of a Racehorse — at age nine, unpublished §
 Sabre: The Horse from the Sea (A & C Black, 1948) ‡, as Kathleen Herald, illus. Lionel Edwards
 The Mandrake: A Pony (Black, 1949) ‡, as Kathleen Herald, ill. Edwards
 Crab the Roan (Black, 1953) ‡, as Kathleen Herald, ill. Peter Biegel

 North to Adventure (1959)
 Stormcock Meets Trouble (1961)
 The Hard Way Home (1962)
 Windfall (1962), ill. Victor Ambrus; US title, Sea Fever
 Brownsea Silver (1964)
 The Maplin Bird (1964), ill. Ambrus
 The Plan for Birdsmarsh (1965), ill. Ambrus
 Thunder in the Sky (1966), ill. Ambrus
 A Pattern of Roses (1972), self-ill. ‡
 The Right-Hand Man (1977) ‡, ill. Ambrus
 Dear Fred (1981) ‡ — based on Fred Archer
 Going Home (1982)
 Who, Sir? Me, Sir? (1983) ‡
 The Last Ditch (1984)  ‡
 Froggett's Revenge (1985)
 The Sound of Distant Cheering (1986)  ‡
 Downhill All the Way (1988)
 Plain Jack (1988) ‡
 Darkling (1989) ‡
 Skylark (1989)
 No Roses Round the Door (1990) ‡
 Poor Badger (1990) ‡
 The Boy Who Wasn't There (1992)
 Late to Smile (1992) ‡
 Apple Won't Jump (1992)
 The Wild Boy and Queen Moon (1993) ‡
 Snowfall (1994)
 Mr Brown (1995)
 Unquiet Spirits (1997)
 The Pony That Went to Sea (1997) ‡
 Windy Webley (1997) ‡, ill. Nick Price – picture book
 Danger Offshore (1998)
 Firehead (1998)
 The Paradise Pony (1999) ‡
 The Scruffy Pony (1999) ‡
 Blind Beauty (1999) ‡
 The Pied Piper (1999)
 Horses (2000) ‡ – nonfiction 
 Stealaway (2001) ‡
 Pony in the Dark (2001) ‡
 Small Gains (2003) ‡
 My Alice (2004)
 Greater Gains (2005) ‡
 Blue Skies and Gunfire (2006)
 Paradise House (2011) ‡
 All That Glitters (2014) ‡

§ By age fifteen, Kathleen Herald had written "about ten more" novels that publishers rejected with "very nice letters".

‡ Jane Badger Books lists these titles among Peyton's "pony books only" – as well as all nineteen series books listed above.

Notes

References

Citations
 "Introduction" by Kathleen Peyton, Fly-By-Night, K M Peyton, Edinburgh: Fidra Books, 2007
 Welcome to the web site of K M Peyton (autobiographical home page). K M Peyton: Author. Retrieved 2012-08-10.

External links
 
 
 KM Peyton at Fidra Books, reprint publisher

British children's writers
British writers of young adult literature
British historical novelists
Pony books
Carnegie Medal in Literature winners
Guardian Children's Fiction Prize winners
People from Birmingham, West Midlands
1929 births
Living people
Members of the Order of the British Empire